The 2015 Mnet Asian Music Awards ceremony, organized by CJ E&M through its music channel Mnet, took place on December 2, 2015, at AsiaWorld-Expo in Hong Kong. The ceremony was the sixth consecutive Mnet Asian Music Awards to be hosted outside of South Korea.

Nominees were announced on October 30, 2015. Leading the nominees and awards was Big Bang with six. By the end of the ceremony the group received four wins alongside Exo, the most received awards of the night.

Background
This event marked the seventeenth Mnet Asian Music Awards. It was simultaneously broadcast live in Korea, Japan, America, Southeast Asia through various channels as well as via online live streaming.

The event took place in the same country and the same venue for the third consecutive time. This year MAMA's theme/concept included "...fantastic stages through 'State of TechArt', a concept that combines cutting-edge technology and art." About 10,000 fans and 2,000 staff members attended the awards show.

Performers

Presenters

 Moon Hee-joon, Shin A-young, Z.Hera – red carpet hosts
 Psy – main host
 Yeo Jin-goo and Kim So-hyun – presented Best New Artist
 Jung Suk-won and Hong Soo-ah – presented Best Music Video
 Seo Kang-joon and Kim So-eun – presented Best Dance Performance – Solo and Best Rap Performance
 Lee Kwang-soo and Park Bo-young – presented Best Female Artist and Best Male Artist
 Park Shin-hye – introduced 'Girls' Education' campaign
 Park Bo-gum – promoted sponsor Olive Young (via video)
 Lee Ki-woo and Stephanie Lee – presented Worldwide Favourite Artist
 Kim Jong-kook – presented Best Asian Artist awardee Jolin Tsai
 Ha Seok-jin and Han Chae-young – presented Global Fan's Choice

 Yoo Yeon-seok and Son Ho-jun – presented Best Vocal Performance
 Go Ah-sung – presented Professional Awards
 Kim Kang-woo and Uee – presented Best Dance Performance – Group
 Park Jin-young – introduced Pet Shop Boys
 Krystal Jung – presented Worldwide Inspiration Award
 Han Suk-joon – introduced performer Exo
 Kim Jong-kook and Park Shin-hye – presented Best Collaboration & Unit
 Claudia Kim and Elena Torres – presented Best World Performer
 Lee Sang-yoon and Choo Ja-hyun – presented Best Male Group and Best Female Group
 Gong Hyo-jin – presented Song of the Year
 Lee Jung-jae and Han Hyo-joo – presented Album of the Year
 Chow Yun-fat – presented Artist of the Year

Judging criteria
Eligible nominees included songs or albums released from October 26, 2014, until October 30 the next year. Winners will be selected based on six categories including online voting and evaluation from MAMA professional panel.

Winners and nominees
Winners are listed first and highlighted in boldface.

Special Awards
 Next Generation Asian Artist – Monsta X
 Best Asian Style – Exo
 iQiYi Worldwide Favourite Artist – Big Bang
 Best Asian Artist: Potato; Dong Nhi; RAN; Stefanie Sun; AKB48; Jolin Tsai
 Sina Weibo Global Fan's Choice – Female: f(x)
 Sina Weibo Global Fan's Choice – Male: Exo
 Best Producer: Park Jin-young; Phuc Bo; Gao Xiaosong
 Best Engineer: Ko Hyun-jong; Lupo ; Yoshinori Nakayama
Best Live Entertainment: In Jae-jin; Wu Qun Da; Vit Suthitnavil
 Worldwide Inspiration Award – Pet Shop Boys
 Best World Performer – BTS

Multiple wins
The following artist(s) received two or more wins (excluding the special awards):

Multiple nominations
The following artist(s) received two or more nominations (excluding the special awards):

2NE1's performance
As CL was the only 2NE1 member originally intended to perform at the event, 2NE1's surprise performance at the award ceremony received considerable media attention. Following the conclusion of CL's "Hello Bitches", the rest of the group suddenly appeared onstage and reunited to perform "Fire" and "I Am the Best". Because of Park Bom's hiatus following her scandal from 2014, it was the group's first performance in a year and would be ultimately their last before their disbandment in 2016. SBS PopAsia wrote that "Fans and press too, were in for a pleasant surprise when 2NE1 appeared on the stage -- members one by one. It went from a CL show to a 2NE1 reunion that no-one was prepared for. The transition was on point and seriously, words cannot do the performances justice." Fuse regarded it as one of the best performances of 2015 worldwide, alongside those of Beyoncé and Madonna. It was named one of the most unforgettable moments in MAMA history by Cosmopolitan Philippines and SBS PopAsia.

Notes

References

External links
 Mnet Asian Music Awards  official website

Mnet
Mnet
MAMA Awards ceremonies
2015 in Hong Kong